The Cat is the 4th animal symbol in the 12-year cycle of the Vietnamese zodiac, and Gurung zodiac, taking place of the Rabbit in the Chinese zodiac. As such, the traits associated with the Rabbit are attributed to the Cat. Cats are in conflict with the Rat.

Legends relating to the order of the Chinese zodiac often include stories as to why the cat was not included among the twelve. Because the Rat tricked the cat into missing the banquet with the Jade Emperor, the cat was not included and was not aware that the banquet was going on and was not given a year, thus began the antipathy between cats and rats. It is possible domesticated cats had not proliferated through China at the zodiac's induction.

Another legend known as "The Great Race" tells that all the animals in the zodiac were headed to the Jade Emperor. The Cat and Rat were the most intelligent of the animals, however they were both also poor swimmers and came across a river. They both tricked the kind, naïve Ox to assist them by letting them ride on its back over the river. As the Ox was approaching the other side of the river, the Rat pushed the Cat into the river, then jumped off the Ox and rushed to the Jade Emperor, becoming the first in the zodiac. All the other animals made it to the Jade Emperor, while the Cat was left to drown in the river after being sabotaged by the Rat. It is said that this is also the reason cats always hunt rats.

There have been various explanations of why the Vietnamese, unlike all other countries who follow the Chinese calendar, have the cat instead of the Rabbit as a zodiac animal. The most common explanation is that in the ordering system (Earthly Branches) that is used for lunar year, the word for used for the "rabbit zodiac" 卯 (Mão ~ Mẹo) sounds like the Vietnamese word for "cat" 貓 (con mèo).

Other Explanations

Other explanations for the use of the cat zodiac in Vietnam come from oral histories that can be difficult to trace to an original source. Vietnam hasn’t always celebrated the Year of the Cat, however it is unclear when the switch from rabbit to cat took place. Mentions of the Year of the Rabbit can be found in many older Vietnamese texts. Different families and cultural groups in Vietnam have unique explanations for the shift, both historical and in folklore. 

One geographical explanation suggests that Chinese nomads living in the savanna had frequent encounters with rabbits in the wild fields. In contrast, the lowland people of Vietnam had less interaction with rabbits and instead chose the domestic cat. Rabbits were viewed as animals used for food, while cats were considered a ‘friendly’ animal. Rabbits are also not commonly raised in Vietnam. 

Another explanation states that in Vietnamese folklore, the cat (which was tricked out of the race by the rat in Chinese legend) actually finishes the race. The Vietnamese legend lacks a rabbit and the cat is able to swim, allowing it to take fourth place. 

Cats hold unique spiritual and practical meaning in Vietnam. They are considered lucky, and help to ward off bad spirits. In the 2011 Year of the Cat, there was a baby boom recorded due to the association of luck with those born under this zodiac. Cats are frequently featured in Vietnamese folklore and rhymes, and are often depicted assisting farmers in chasing away rats. Rice farming is very important to Vietnamese agriculture, and the threat of field rats means cats are a popular animal for farmers.

The shift to the cat also reflects a difference in cultural values. While the Year of the Rabbit is considered to be mild and peaceful, the cat symbolizes strength, power, and aggression. Another cultural explanation suggests the Vietnamese closely linked the mouse (rat) and rabbit, and didn’t want to observe two similar years.

In addition to the cat, the Vietnamese also celebrate the Year of the Buffalo as opposed to the Year of the Ox in the Chinese zodiac.

Years and the Five Elements

People born within the date ranges below can be said to have been born under the "Year of the Cat", instead of "Year of the Rabbit".

Vietnamese zodiac Cat

Basic astrology elements

See also
Cat

References

Vietnamese astrological signs
Mythological felines
Cats in popular culture
Chinese astrological signs
Cat folklore